The 1958 Maine gubernatorial election took place on September 8, 1958. Incumbent Democratic Governor Edmund Muskie, was term limited and seeking election to the United States Senate, thus did not run.  Democrat Clinton Clauson, then mayor of Waterville, unexpectedly defeated Muskie's chosen Democratic candidate in the primary, and faced off against the popular previous two term Republican Governor, Horace Hildreth in the general election.  Hildreth was the heavy favorite to win, however Clauson was able to narrowly defeat him, retaining the Blaine House for the Democrats.

The election was also the last time that Maine would hold its election in September.  Traditionally, Maine had held its elections two months before the rest of the nation, which had help give birth to the phrase "As Maine goes, so goes the nation" and its status as a bellwether state.  However, following a 1957 referendum, the state constitution was amended to hold all elections after 1958 in November and shift from two-year to four-year terms.

Results

Notes

1958
Maine
Gubernatorial
Maine gubernatorial election